The 1979 Japan Series  was the 30th edition of Nippon Professional Baseball's postseason championship series. It matched the Central League champion Hiroshima Carp against the Pacific League champion Kintetsu Buffaloes. The Carp defeated the Buffaloes for their first Japan Series championship in team history.

Summary

References

See also 
1979 Pacific League Playoffs
1979 World Series

Japan Series
Japan Series, 1979
Japan Series
Japan Series
Japan Series
Hiroshima Toyo Carp
Osaka Kintetsu Buffaloes